ʻAbd al-Rāziq (ALA-LC romanization of ) is a Muslim male given name.

People
Abdul Raziq Achakzai (1979-2018), former Afghan police chief
 Abdul Raziq Bugti
 Abousfian Abdelrazik (born 1962), Sudanese-Canadian accused of terrorism
Ali Abdel Raziq (1888–1966), Egyptian Islamic scholar
Mahmoud Abdel Razek Fadlallah, known as Shikabala (born 1986), Egyptian footballer
 Abdul Raziq Bugti (1952–2007), Pakistani politician

Arabic masculine given names